Vista is an album by American jazz saxophonist Marion Brown recorded in 1975 and released on the Impulse! label.

Reception
The AllMusic review by Scott Yanow states: "This disc certainly boasts an impressive backup crew but does not seem to know what it wants to be. The solos are relatively short... and little that is all that memorable actually occurs. Better to acquire Marion Brown's earlier recordings".

Track listing
 "Maimoun" (Stanley Cowell) - 7:33 
 "Visions" (Stevie Wonder) - 5:40 
 "Vista" (Marion Brown) - 7:44 
 "Moment of Truth" (Bill Braynon) - 4:36 
 "Bismillahi 'Rrahmani' Rrahim" (Harold Budd) - 6:02 
 "Djinji" (Braynon) - 9:45

Personnel
 Marion Brown — alto saxophone, wind chimes
 Stanley Cowell (tracks 1-3, 5-6)
 Anthony Davis — piano, electric piano
 Bill Braynon — celeste, electric piano (tracks 2-5)
 Reggie Workman — bass (tracks 1 & 3-6)
 Jimmy Hopps — drums (tracks 1 & 3-5)
 Ed Blackwell — drums, slit drums,  (tracks 3 & 6)
 Jose Goico — congas, tambourine (tracks 1 & 3-6)
 Allen Murphy — vocals (track 2), bells (track 5)
 Harold Budd — celeste, gong (track 5)

Production credits
 Ed Michel — Producer
 Tony May — Recording engineering (Generation Sound, NYC)
 Baker Bigsby — Mix engineering and additional recording (Westone Audio, LA)

References

Impulse! Records albums
Marion Brown albums
1975 albums